Happy Birthday is a collaboration album by Pete Townshend, the guitarist for The Who and friends, including Ronnie Lane. It was pressed and released in 1970 by Universal Spiritual League.

The album was originally released in February 1970 (in commemoration of Meher Baba's birthday on 25 February) as the first in a series of tribute albums dedicated to Pete Townshend's spiritual mentor Meher Baba.

Only about 2,500 copies were pressed in the original 1970 issue.

The album was reissued in similar numbers in 1977.

Later albums by Pete Townshend and friends dedicated to Meher Baba included I Am, With Love, and Avatar (a compilation of the previous three albums, later released as Jai Baba). Several songs from Happy Birthday and I Am reappeared in the 1972 Pete Townshend's solo album Who Came First.

Track listing

References

External links
 Lyrics
 Pete Townshend solo album index
 Meher Baba Tribute Albums by Pete Townshend

1970 debut albums
Concept albums
Meher Baba tribute albums
Pete Townshend albums
Ronnie Lane albums
Albums produced by Pete Townshend